Andy Friedman was an American professional football player at fullback, as well as the manager of the Syracuse Pros in 1921.  The Pros were a professional team from Syracuse, New York. It is suspected, though not certain, that the team joined the American Professional Football Association (now the National Football League) in 1921.

References
 

Year of birth missing
Year of death missing
American football fullbacks
Syracuse Pros players